Phrynobatrachus calcaratus, the Boutry river frog or Peters' puddle frog, is a species of frog in the family Phrynobatrachidae. It is widely distributed in West Africa (Senegal, Guinea-Bissau, Guinea, Liberia, Ivory Coast, Ghana, Togo, Benin, and Nigeria, and possibly adjacent countries) and Middle Africa (Cameroon, Central African Republic, and Bioko (Equatorial Guinea), possibly wider). However, this nominal species is a species complex consisting of several species.

Description
The digits do not have enlarged tips and the fingers and toes are largely unwebbed. Most animals have a uniformly coloured greenish or brownish dorsal surface, slightly darker around the warts, and a whitish belly, but some have a spinal band of red with yellowish borders and a few have a red transverse band. The male has a prominent black vocal sac on the throat during the breeding season.

Habitat
This species is found in gallery forests in humid savannas, secondary forest along streams in the forest zone, and farm bush; it can also colonize savanna that has not burned.

Reproduction
The males call near suitable waterbodies and the females lay clutches of a few hundred eggs which hatch in three days. Tadpole growth is fast and the animals become mature at four to five months. They have a short lifespan and probably die within a few months of spawning.

Status
Phrynobatrachus calcaratus is listed by the International Union for Conservation of Nature (IUCN) as being of "least concern" as it is an adaptable species with a very wide range and its numbers appear to be stable.

References

calcaratus
Frogs of Africa
Amphibians of West Africa
Fauna of Benin
Amphibians of Cameroon
Amphibians of the Central African Republic
Amphibians of Equatorial Guinea
Fauna of Ghana
Fauna of Guinea
Fauna of Guinea-Bissau
Fauna of Ivory Coast
Fauna of Nigeria
Amphibians of the Republic of the Congo
Fauna of Senegal
Fauna of Sierra Leone
Fauna of Togo
Taxa named by Wilhelm Peters
Amphibians described in 1863
Taxonomy articles created by Polbot